Bowling Heights is a historic home located in Upper Marlboro, Prince George's County, Maryland, United States. It is a large -story frame house constructed in 1877 in the High Victorian Gothic style.

Bowling Heights was listed on the National Register of Historic Places in 1982.

References

External links
, including photo in 1974, at Maryland Historical Trust website

Houses completed in 1877
Houses in Prince George's County, Maryland
Gothic Revival architecture in Maryland
Houses on the National Register of Historic Places in Maryland
Historic American Buildings Survey in Maryland
National Register of Historic Places in Prince George's County, Maryland
1877 establishments in Maryland